Aleksandr Vladimirovich Kibalko (born 25 October 1973) is a Russian speed skater. He competed at the 1998 Winter Olympics, the 2002 Winter Olympics and the 2006 Winter Olympics.

References

1973 births
Living people
Russian male speed skaters
Olympic speed skaters of Russia
Speed skaters at the 1998 Winter Olympics
Speed skaters at the 2002 Winter Olympics
Speed skaters at the 2006 Winter Olympics
Sportspeople from Astana